The Bergslagen Artillery Regiment, designation  A 9, is a Swedish Army artillery unit which has operated in various forms from 1943 to 2000 and again from 4 December 2022 after the Swedish government decided to re-form the regiment in Kristinehamn as Bergslagen Artillery Regiment (A 9) with full operational capability reached by 2025.

History
The regiment was created as part of a build-up of the Swedish Army during World War II, so that Sweden's neutrality could be protected. In accordance with the Defence Act of 2000, the regiment and the other artillery regiments of the Swedish Army were amalgamated into the Artillery Regiment, in Kristinehamn, which took the A 9 designation from the Bergslagen Artillery Regiment.

The regiment was re-inaugurated by His Royal Highness Prince Carl Philip, Duke of Värmland in Brogårdshallen in Kristinehamn on 4 December 2022. To the tunes of the Royal Swedish Army Band and Swedish flags as a background, A 9's standard from the Boden Artillery Regiment (A 8), was returned.

Heraldry and traditions

Colours, standards and guidons
When the regiment was raised it was presented with a regimental standard by Crown Prince Gustaf Adolf on 27 April 1945. The regiment also took over some traditions from the Uppland Artillery Regiment (A 5), including the march. The colour was taken over from the Position Artillery Regiment (Positionsartilleriregementet, A 9).

Coat of arms
The coat of the arms of the Bergslagen Artillery Regiment (A 9) 1977–2000. Blazon: "Per pale argent and azure; argent an eagle wings elevated and displayed azure, armed and langued gules, azure an iron sign argent. The shield surmoun-ted two gunbarrels of older pattern in saltire or. The gunbarrels may be sable".

Medals
In 1944, the Bergslagens artilleriregementes (A 9) idrottsmedalj ("Bergslagen Artillery Regiment (A 9) Sports Medal") in gold (BergslartregidrottGM) of the 8th size was established. The medal ribbon is divided in blue and white moiré.

In 1950, the Kamratföreningen Bergslagsartilleristers (A 9) förtjänstmedalj ("ervice Club of Bergslagen Artillery (A 9) Medal of Merit") in silver (KBergartSM) of the 8th size. The medal ribbon is of blue moiré with white edges and a broad white stripe on each side.

In 1991, the Bergslagens artilleriregementes (A 9) förtjänstmedalj ("Bergslagen Artillery Regiment (A 9) Medal of Merit") in silver (BergartregSM) of the 8th size was established. The medal ribbon is of red moiré with a broad grey stripe on each side.

Commanding officers
Regimental commander from 1943 to 30 June 2000.

1943–1946: Carl Årmann
1946–1952: Axel Philipson
1952–1955: Thorsten Berggren
1955–1959: Fredrik Hård
1959–1964: Sven Sandahl
1964–1965: Nils Holmstedt
1965–1974: Sten Claëson
1974–1982: Gösta Mittag-Leffler
1982–1986: Carl Carlsson
1986–1992: Lars Carlson
1992–1994: Kjell Forssmark
1994–2000: Birger Almlöw
2022-12-01 – 20xx: Lars O Jonsson

Names, designations and locations

See also
List of Swedish artillery regiments

Footnotes

References

Notes

Print

Further reading

Artillery regiments of the Swedish Army
Military units and formations established in 1943
Military units and formations disestablished in 2000
Military units and formations established in 2022
1943 establishments in Sweden
2000 disestablishments in Sweden
2022 establishments in Sweden
Kristinehamn
Bergslagen